Taiwanese language is a name for Taiwanese Hokkien.

Taiwanese language may also refer to:
 Formosan languages, languages of the indigenous and aboriginal peoples of Taiwan
 Taiwanese Hakka, Hakka language in Taiwan
 Taiwanese Mandarin, Standard Mandarin Chinese spoken in Taiwan
 Modern Taiwanese Language (MTL) or Modern Literal Taiwanese (MLT), a Romanization system for Taiwanese Hokkien
 Taiwanese Language Phonetic Alphabet (TLPA), Romanization system for both Hakka and Hokkien

See also
 Languages of Taiwan